Lake of Gruyère (or ) is an artificial lake in the La Gruyère region of the Canton of Fribourg, Switzerland.

The reservoir was formed between the cities of Bulle and Fribourg, by building the Rossens Dam on the Sarine river in 1948. The arch dam has a height of 83 m and a crest length of 320 m. The reservoir filled in about four months after completion. The dam is operated by the Groupe E SA.

The remains of the castle of Pont (or Pont-en-Ogoz) and a chapel are located on the Ile d'Ogoz, one of the five islets in the lake.

The "Viaduc du Lac de Gruyère" of the A12 motorway was built in the 1970s. The bridge has a total length of 2043 m and crosses three valleys, including two arms of the lake.

See also
List of lakes of Switzerland

External links

Swissdams: Rossens

Swisscastles: Ogoz

Gruyere
Gruyere
Gruyere
Gruyere
RGruyere